{{DISPLAYTITLE:Vitamin B3}}

Vitamin B3, colloquially referred to as niacin, is a vitamin family that includes three forms or vitamers: niacin (nicotinic acid), nicotinamide (niacinamide), and nicotinamide riboside. All three forms of vitamin B3 are converted within the body to nicotinamide adenine dinucleotide (NAD). NAD is required for human life and people are unable to make it within their bodies without either vitamin B3 or tryptophan. Nicotinamide riboside was identified as a form of vitamin B3 in 2004.

Niacin (the nutrient) can be manufactured by plants and animals from the amino acid tryptophan. Niacin is obtained in the diet from a variety of whole and processed foods, with highest contents in fortified packaged foods, meat, poultry, red fish such as tuna and salmon, lesser amounts in nuts, legumes and seeds. Niacin as a dietary supplement is used to treat pellagra, a disease caused by niacin deficiency. Signs and symptoms of pellagra include skin and mouth lesions, anemia, headaches, and tiredness. Many countries mandate its addition to wheat flour or other food grains, thereby reducing the risk of pellagra.

The amide nicotinamide (niacinamide) is a component of the coenzymes nicotinamide adenine dinucleotide (NAD) and nicotinamide adenine dinucleotide phosphate (NADP+). Although niacin and nicotinamide are identical in their vitamin activity, nicotinamide does not have the same pharmacological, lipid-modifying effects or side effects as niacin, i.e., when niacin takes on the -amide group, it does not reduce cholesterol nor cause flushing. Nicotinamide is recommended as a treatment for niacin deficiency because it can be administered in remedial amounts without causing the flushing, considered an adverse effect. In the past, the group was loosely referred to as vitamin B3 complex.

Mechanism of action
Nicotinamide adenine dinucleotide (NAD), along with its phosphorylated variant nicotinamide adenine dinucleotide phosphate (NADP), are utilized in transfer reactions within DNA repair and calcium mobilization. NAD also plays a critical role in human metabolism, acting as a coenzyme in both glycolysis and the Krebs cycle.

Vitamin deficiency

Severe vitamin B3 deficiency in the diet causes the disease pellagra, characterized by diarrhea, sun-sensitive dermatitis involving hyperpigmentation and thickening of the skin (see image), inflammation of the mouth and tongue, delirium, dementia, and if left untreated, death. Common psychiatric symptoms include irritability, poor concentration, anxiety, fatigue, loss of memory, restlessness, apathy, and depression. The biochemical mechanisms for the observed deficiency-caused neurodegeneration are not well understood, but may rest on A) the requirement for nicotinamide adenine dinucleotide (NAD+) to suppress the creation of neurotoxic tryptophan metabolites; B) inhibition of mitochondrial ATP generation resulting in cell damage; C) activation of the poly (ADP-ribose) polymerase (PARP) pathway, as PARP is a nuclear enzyme involved in DNA repair, but in the absence of NAD+ can lead to cell death; D) reduced synthesis of neuro-protective brain-derived neurotrophic factor or its receptor tropomyosin receptor kinase B; or, E) changes to genome expression directly due to the niacin deficiency.

Niacin deficiency is rarely seen in developed countries, and it is more typically associated with poverty, malnutrition or malnutrition secondary to chronic alcoholism. It also tends to occur in less developed areas where people eat maize (corn) as a staple food, as maize is the only grain low in digestible niacin. A cooking technique called nixtamalization, that is, pretreating with alkali ingredients, increases the bioavailability of niacin during maize meal or flour production. For this reason, people who consume corn as tortillas or hominy are at less risk of niacin deficiency.

For treating deficiency, the World Health Organization (WHO) recommends administering niacinamide (i.e. nicotinamide) instead of niacin, to avoid the flushing side effect commonly caused by the latter. Guidelines suggest using 300 mg/day for three to four weeks. Dementia and dermatitis show improvement within a week. Because deficiencies of other B-vitamins may be present, the WHO recommends a multi-vitamin in addition to the niacinamide.

Hartnup disease is a hereditary nutritional disorder resulting in niacin deficiency. It is named after an English family with a genetic disorder that resulted in a failure to absorb the essential amino acid tryptophan, tryptophan being a precursor for niacin synthesis. The symptoms are similar to pellagra, including red, scaly rash and sensitivity to sunlight. Oral niacin or niacinamide is given as a treatment for this condition in doses ranging from 50 to 100 mg twice a day, with a good prognosis if identified and treated early. Niacin synthesis is also deficient in carcinoid syndrome, because of metabolic diversion of its precursor tryptophan to form serotonin.

Measuring vitamin status
Plasma concentrations of niacin and niacin metabolites are not useful markers of niacin status. Urinary excretion of the methylated metabolite N1-methyl-nicotinamide is considered reliable and sensitive. The measurement requires a 24-hour urine collection. For adults, a value of less than 5.8 μmol/day represent deficient niacin status and 5.8 to 17.5 μmol/day represents low. According to the World Health Organization, an alternative mean of expressing urinary N1-methyl-nicotinamide is as mg/g creatinine in a 24-hour urine collection, with deficient defined as <0.5, low 0.5-1.59, acceptable 1.6-4.29, and high >4.3 Niacin deficiency occurs before the signs and symptoms of pellagra appear. Erythrocyte nicotinamide adenine dinucleotide (NAD) concentrations potentially provide another sensitive indicator of niacin depletion, although definitions of deficient, low and adequate have not been established. Lastly, plasma tryptophan decreases on a low niacin diet because tryptophan converts to niacin. However, low tryptophan could also be caused by a diet low in this essential amino acid, so it is not specific to confirming vitamin status.

Dietary recommendations

The U.S. Institute of Medicine (renamed National Academy of Medicine in 2015) updated Estimated Average Requirements (EARs) and Recommended Dietary Allowances (RDAs) for niacin in 1998, as well as Tolerable upper intake levels (ULs). In lieu of an RDA, Adequate Intakes (AIs) are identified for populations for which there is not enough evidence to identify a dietary intake level that is sufficient to meet the nutrient requirements of most people. (see table).

The European Food Safety Authority (EFSA) refers to the collective set of information as Dietary Reference Values (DRV), with Population Reference Intake (PRI) instead of RDA, and Average Requirement instead of EAR. For the EU, AIs and ULs have the same definition as in the US, except that units are milligrams per megajoule (MJ) of energy consumed rather than mg/day. For women (including those pregnant or lactating), men and children the PRI is 1.6 mg per megajoule. As the conversion is 1 MJ = 239 kcal, an adult consuming 2390 kilocalories should be consuming 16 mg niacin. This is comparable to US RDAs (14 mg/day for adult women, 16 mg/day for adult men).

ULs are established by identifying amounts of vitamins and minerals that cause adverse effects, and then selecting as an upper limit amounts that are the "maximum daily intake unlikely to cause adverse health effects". Regulatory agencies from different countries do not always agree. For the US, 30 or 35 mg for teenagers and adults, less for children. The EFSA UL for adults is set at 10 mg/day – about one-third of the US value. For all of the government ULs, the term applies to niacin as a supplement consumed as one dose, and is intended as a limit to avoid the skin flush reaction. This explains why for EFSA, the recommended daily intake can be higher than the UL.

Both the DRI and DRV describe amounts needed as niacin equivalents (NE), calculated as 1 mg NE = 1 mg niacin or 60 mg of the essential amino acid tryptophan. This is because the amino acid is utilized to synthesize the vitamin.

For U.S. food and dietary supplement labeling purposes, the amount in a serving is expressed as a percent of Daily Value (%DV). For niacin labeling purposes 100% of the Daily Value is 16 mg. Prior to 27 May 2016 it was 20 mg, revised to bring it into agreement with the RDA. 
Compliance with the updated labeling regulations was required by 1 January 2020 for manufacturers with US$10 million or more in annual food sales, and by 1 January 2021 for manufacturers with lower volume food sales. A table of the old and new adult daily values is provided at Reference Daily Intake.

Sources
Niacin is found in a variety of whole and processed foods, including fortified packaged foods, meat from various animal sources, seafoods, and spices. In general, animal-sourced foods provide about 5–10 mg niacin per serving, although dairy foods and eggs have little. Some plant-sourced foods such as nuts, legumes and grains provide about 2–5 mg niacin per serving, although in some grain products this naturally present niacin is largely bound to polysaccharides and glycopeptides, making it only about 30% bioavailable. Fortified food ingredients such as wheat flour have niacin added, which is bioavailable. Among whole food sources with the highest niacin content per 100 grams:

Vegetarian and vegan diets can provide adequate amounts if products such as nutritional yeast, peanuts, peanut butter, tahini, brown rice, mushrooms, avocado and sunflower seeds are included. Fortified foods and dietary supplements can also be consumed to ensure adequate intake.

Food preparation
Niacin naturally found in food is susceptible to destruction from high heat cooking, especially in the presence of acidic foods and sauces. It is soluble in water, and so may also be lost from foods boiled in water.

Food fortification
Countries fortify foods with nutrients to address known deficiencies. As of 2020, 54 countries required food fortification of wheat flour with niacin or niacinamide; 14 also mandate fortification of maize flour, and 6 mandate fortification of rice. From country to country, niacin fortification ranges from 1.3 to 6.0 mg/100 g.

As a dietary supplement
In the United States, niacin (the acid) is sold as a non-prescription dietary supplement with a range of 100 to 1000 mg per serving. These products often have a Structure/Function health claim allowed by the US Food & Drug Administration (FDA). An example would be "Supports a healthy blood lipid profile." The American Heart Association (AHA) strongly advises against the use of non-prescription dietary supplement niacin rather than prescription niacin because of potentially serious side effects. For this reason and because the manufacture of dietary supplement niacin is not as well-regulated by the FDA as is prescription niacin, the AHA advises that supplemental niacin only be used under the supervision of a health care professional. More than 30 mg niacin consumed as a dietary supplement can cause skin flushing. Face, arms and chest skin turns a reddish color because of vasodilation of small subcutaneous blood vessels, accompanied by sensations of heat, tingling and itching. These signs and symptoms are typically transient, lasting minutes to hours; they are considered unpleasant rather than toxic.

Toxicity 
The daily limit for vitamin B3 has been set at 35 mg. At daily doses of as low as 30 mg, flushing has been reported, always starting in the face and sometimes accompanied by skin dryness, itching, paresthesia, and headache. Liver toxicity is the most serious toxic reaction and it occurs at doses >2 grams/day. Fulminant hepatitis has been reported at doses between 3-9 grams/day with needs for liver transplantation. Other reactions include glucose intolerance, hyperuricemia, macular edema, and macular cysts.

History 

Corn (maize) became a staple food in the southeast United States and in parts of Europe. A disease that was characterized by dermatitis of sunlight-exposed skin was described in Spain in 1735 by Gaspar Casal. He attributed the cause to poor diet. In northern Italy it was named pellagra from the Lombard language (agra = holly-like or serum-like; pell = skin). In time, the disease was more closely linked specifically to corn. In the US, Joseph Goldberger was assigned to study pellagra by the Surgeon General of the United States. His studies confirmed a corn-based diet as the culprit, but he did not identify the root cause.

Nicotinic acid was extracted from the liver by biochemist Conrad Elvehjem in 1937. He later identified the active ingredient, referring to it as "pellagra-preventing factor" and the "anti-blacktongue factor." It was also referred to as "vitamin PP", "vitamin P-P" and "PP-factor", all derived from the term "pellagra-preventive factor". In the late 1930s, studies by Tom Douglas Spies, Marion Blankenhorn, and Clark Cooper confirmed that niacin cured pellagra in humans. The prevalence of the disease was greatly reduced as a result.

In 1942, when flour enrichment with nicotinic acid began, a headline in the popular press said "Tobacco in Your Bread." In response, the Council on Foods and Nutrition of the American Medical Association approved of the Food and Nutrition Board's new names niacin and niacin amide for use primarily by non-scientists. It was thought appropriate to choose a name to dissociate nicotinic acid from nicotine, to avoid the perception that vitamins or niacin-rich food contains nicotine, or that cigarettes contain vitamins. The resulting name niacin was derived from cotinic id + vitam.

J. Laguna and K.J. Carpenter found in 1951, that niacin in corn is biologically unavailable and can be released only in very alkaline lime water of pH 11. This explains why a Latin-American culture that used alkali-treated (nixtamalized) cornmeal to make tortilla was not at risk for niacin deficiency.

References

B vitamins
CYP2D6 inhibitors
CYP3A4 inhibitors